Étival-Clairefontaine is a commune in the Vosges department in Grand Est in northeastern France.

The Clairefontaine Paper Mill is located in this city.

The origins of Sanctivagium, altered in medieval Latin as Stivagium and Estival Old French, date back to the 7th century.

See also
Communes of the Vosges department

References

External links

Official website 

Communes of Vosges (department)